Betina O'Connell (Buenos Aires, March 17, 1976) is an Argentinian actress of theatre and television. She gained fame after her performance in the Young Adult show Montaña rusa. In 2014 she played Irene in Somos familia.

Television

References

External links 

Actresses from Buenos Aires
Argentine stage actresses
Argentine telenovela actresses
Argentine people of Irish descent
1976 births
Living people